The West Wetlands Park is a public park at the northwest edge of Yuma, Arizona. It is located along the Colorado River within the Yuma Crossing National Heritage Area. The park opened December, 2002  on 110 acres of city-owned land. It was partially constructed by community volunteers and has been regularly voted Yuma's best park. The West Wetlands Park is currently managed by the Yuma Crossing National Heritage Area Corporation, a non-profit organization, and maintained by the City of Yuma Parks and Recreation Department.

History

1910–1989 

From 1910 to 1970 the area that would become West Wetlands Park was used as the City of Yuma landfill. After the landfill was closed, the deserted unsightly area attracted vagrants and criminals. Periodically, fires burned native vegetation along the river allowing invasive species to overtake the habitat. The area became a hazard to local residents, who were cut off from the resources of the river.

Beginning in the 1980's, there was an interest by Yuma citizens to convert the previous landfill into a riverfront park. Arizona State Parks worked with the City of Yuma to develop a master plan which was stalled due to lack of funding.

1990–1999 

In early 1990, the United States Environmental Protection Agency (EPA) determined that covering the whole site with 6 to 8 feet of clean fill was required for reuse. The Yuma Crossing National Heritage Area understood that $10 million would be needed as they were tasked to design a master plan which would include securing the funds for the clean up and construction. An implementation team was required to obtain grants and manage the construction of the project.

The first success in obtaining funding was a $23,000 grant from the Arizona Game and Fish Department. Another endowment was secured by Congressman Ed Pastor from the Bureau of Reclamation. The $1.45 million would be used to improve areas adjacent to reclamation land, as well as the building of a boat ramp.

Over a three-year period, the Heritage Area was able to garner many other grants, which were used to advance the planning of the park. Three grants were received from the State of Arizona Heritage Fund: $95,000 trails grant, $372,500 SLIF grant; and a $547,500 LRSP grant. Another grant of $1 million was provided by the City of Yuma to help with building roads and utility infrastructure within the park, and directed all Public Works projects to transport clean fill to the site.

In September 1999 the master plan was complete when the Heritage Area sponsored a community planning effort to finalize the design of West Wetlands. A part of "Phase 1" occurred a month later when the Yuma Crossing hosted a volunteer day, where 700 volunteers planted 450 trees at the Millennium Tree Grove.

2000–2006 

In 2001, an additional $500,000 was secured by Congressman Ed Pastor through the Bureau of Reclamation, for the pilot re-vegetation project. The first phase of the park development opened in December 2002. The pond was dug out in the first phase of the project and was completed, filled, and opened in late 2003 with the additional Reclamation grant funds. The pond has a bowl design and is approximately 15 feet deep.

In 2005, Arizona Public Service (APS) partnered with the City of Yuma to develop a solar garden as a solar demonstration area. The solar garden consists of twenty-four photo-voltaic energy panels that produce 3,600 watts of power that is directed to the City of Yuma electrical grid and provides power for the lighting within the park. Approximately twenty homes can be powered with this energy. The output of a single tracker is displayed in the armada in front of the solar garden. They rotate 80 degrees from the East in the morning to the West in the afternoon.  After dark they utilize a very small amount from the grid to move the panels to face the East. The solar garden is owned and maintained by APS.

The Army of the West statue, also known as the Mormon statue, was created by R.C. Merrill. The statue was erected and funded entirely with private funds along with a commitment for ongoing maintenance in 2006. Many Mormons of the Yuma community collaborated in the making of the nine foot bronze statue. 2nd Lt. Philemon Merrill and others participated in the 1900-mile march from Council Bluffs, Iowa to San Diego, California, which included crossing the Colorado River on January 9 and 10 of 1846. The statue was erected to honor the crossing and the contributions of those military organizations that led to the expansion of the west.

2007–present 

In 2007, the Stewart Vincent Wolfe Creative Playground was created by the combined effort of Yuman volunteers in honor of Stewart Vincent Wolfe's memory. Wolfe and his family were regular visitors at the park. Ron Martin, a close friend of Wolfe, donated $100,000.00 towards construction of the playground in honor of Wolfe. The development of playground started with a total of 8,000 Yuma volunteers, who raised a total of $45,264.00 to contribute to the construction of the playground. The creative inspiration for the artistic design of the playground was inspired by elementary school students.

For the rest of 2007, the initial plan for West Wetlands from 1999, was updated by the Heritage Area and the City of Yuma.

In 2009, using economic stimulus funds provided by the federal government, the paved walking trail was extended from the playground area all the way to the southwest entrance to the park. The trail parallels the main road through the park and is equipped with lighting, increasing accessibility to the western portions of the park into the evening and providing bikers and joggers with a paved surface from one end of the park to the other.

On December 28, 2014 the Stewart Vincent Wolfe Creative Playground was destroyed by a fire, which appeared intentional according to the local police department. The park's reconstruction started in September 2015, and re-opened 3 months later, on December 19.

2017 

The castle park ended due to an arsonist stunt.

Activities and special events 

The City of Yuma Parks and Recreation has several multi-use trails within the park. On the open grassy areas, one can see kite flyers, yoga enthusiasts, as well as soccer, football, baseball, softball, and disc golf. People gather for picnics, parties, barbecues, field trips, geocaching, club meetings, dating, weddings, memorial services, family reunions, and quinceañeras. People also use the park for photography, bird watching, sightseeing, dog walking, painting, studying, reading, and just relaxing.

Other activities in the park include fishing in the pond and/or the Colorado River for a variety of fish such as catfish, bluegill, carp, rainbow trout, red-ear sunfish, mullet, and largemouth bass. Other activities that take place in or on the river include tubing, canoeing, kayaking, motor boating, jet skiing, and swimming. The park has a boat launch ramp to facilitate putting craft into the water. On the pond, enthusiasts sail model sailboats.

For children, West Wetlands has two playgrounds, the biggest and most visited being the Stewart Vincent Wolfe Creative Playground. The playground area in the Stewart Vincent Wolfe playground, consists of a tire swing, 4 regular swings, 1 adaptive swing for children with disabilities, a climbing wall, 6 slides, a train, a jet, monkey bars, multiple entrances, and more. The playground is surrounded by Pebble Flex ground which is soft for children that may trip or fall. It also makes it easier for wheelchair navigation. There is an area within the playground designed for younger children. It includes one entrance, 3 baby/bucket swings, and smaller swings. It is convenient for those families that have children of multiple ages. There are benches around multiple spots in the playground. There is also a play area that has faux rocks and a metal tractor scoop toy, both which children can climb on.

Special events at the park include:
 Walkathons/marathons Various 10k and 5k runs, Color Runs, the March of Dimes, the Diabetes Walk, Toro Loco and others.
 Colorado River Balloon Festival
 Two Rivers Renaissance Faire
 Movies in the park
 Blue Grass in the Park
 Jazz on the Green
 Catfish Rodeo
 Annual Float-down Regatta

Plants

Invasive plants 

The Yuma West Wetlands park was inhabited by several types of invasive plant species such as the salt cedar tree (Tamarix ramosissima), giant reed (Arundo donax), Russian olive (Elaeagnus angustifolia), buffelgrass (Cenchrus ciliaris), and common mullein (Verbascum thapsus).

The salt cedar (Tamarix ramosissima) tree is particularly dangerous to the ecology of the West Wetlands Park due to the salt that is secreted through its leaves which increases the salinity of the surface soil. Increased salinity of the soil is lethal for all native vegetation and animal species. It grows very successfully along riparian zones and tends to completely replace all native vegetation in these areas. Salt cedar communities support less native bird populations. It absorbs water at an exponential rate, across the entirety of the Colorado River System, it is responsible for a daily absorption of 200 gallons of water.

Giant reed (Arundo donax), also known as wild cane is an invasive species that has greatly compromised the lower Colorado River riparian. The United States Department of Agriculture describes it as a perennial grass that grows from nine to thirty feet in height. Successful establishment of giant reed within a riparian area results in a decline of the native plant species. It does not provide shelter or food for the native wildlife species, so large areas invaded by giant reed have little or no wildlife living amongst it. It dominates the river bank and does not provide the necessary shading for river edge habitats, resulting in warmer water and a lower diversity of aquatic animals. The giant reed along with the salt cedar, have greatly devastated and degraded the lower Colorado River riparian.

Russian olive, buffelgrass, and common mullein are not as destructive as salt cedar tree, but these invasive plants aggressively expand and reproduce at rapid rates to destroy or push out native species.

Native plants 

The native plant species located at the West Wetlands Park are the cattail (Typha latifolia), arrowweed (Pluchea sericea), coyote willow (Salix exigua), four-wing saltbush (Atriplex canescens), quail bush (Atriplex lentiformis), and seep-willow (Baccharis salicifolia). Trees include cottonwood (Populus fremontii) Goodding's willow (Salix gooddingii), honey mesquite (Prosopis juliflora var. torreyana = v. Prosopis glandulosa), and screwbean mesquite (Prosopis pubescens).

Animals

Mammals
The park hosts several native mammals, including: beaver, cottontail rabbit, round-tailed ground squirrel and Botta's pocket gopher.

Birds
Burrowing owl

In 2006, the City of Yuma received funds for the "Yuma West Wetlands Burrowing Owl Habitat" project. The project constructed a viewing platform to allow for public observation and established 20 artificial burrows for relocation of displaced owls. There is a sign at either end of the habitat directing visitors to the location of the viewing platform.  The habitat is a series of PVC pipe protruding from the ground nestled amongst large sage bushes. The western burrowing owl (Athene cunicularia) is the only known owl that spends the majority of its life underground including raising their young. As opposed to most owls which are mainly nocturnal, burrowing owls are active during the day as well. Due to the significant time spent underground, construction projects have been detrimental to the owls and their habitats to the extent of being "Endangered in Canada, Threatened in Mexico, and a Species of Special Concern in Florida and much of the Western US". "Burrowing owls are not able to dig their own burrows, but create homes in existing underground spaces. Deserted squirrel burrows, kangaroo rat mounds, coyote, fox, skunk and badger dens provide homes for the owls". "They are covered in brown spotted feathers and have long legs. They also sport distinctive white "eyebrows" above bright yellow eyes".

Hummingbirds

The West Wetlands Park also contains a hummingbird garden that was named after former Yuma district Congressman, Ed Pastor, in appreciation of his great efforts in supporting the restoration and funding of the riverfront parks projects. There are two signs giving different information about the hummingbird garden. The first sign has four maps of North and South America showing the different migration patterns of the four common hummingbirds found in the garden. The next sign describes the specific plants as well as the perennial flowers planted year round that have specific colour spectrum that attract the four hummingbirds opposed to other pollinating insects. It also describes that these hummingbirds prefer dense foliage, trees, shrubs, and vines which allow for easy perching. Arizona is home to 18 hummingbird species, and the West Wetlands Park is home to four of them in the hummingbird garden, including: Anna's hummingbird (Calypte anna), the black-chinned hummingbird (Archilochus alexandri), Costa's hummingbird (Calypte costae) and the rufous hummingbird (Selasphorus rufus).

Other birds 
With the continued work done to restore the wetlands to a native environment, the bird population has doubled and the diversity is up by 75%.  Among the endangered and threatened species that have been sighted are: Yuma clapper rail (Rallus longirostris), southwestern willow flycatcher (Empidonax traillii) and  western yellow-billed cuckoo (Coccyzus americanus).

The flagship species, the white-faced ibis, has been seen returning, nesting and feeding in the West Wetlands. Some of the other sightings include the great and snowy egrets, and the long-billed Savannah sparrows. These are a few of the species that have returned to nest, feed and stop off on their migratory journey. Other birds seen during the winter are: hooded and common mergansers (if there is enough water), green heron, sharp-shinned and Cooper's hawks, belted kingfisher, black and Say's phoebes. Some expected and seasonal residents include the warblers, all the western warblers are possible during the right season: Wilson's, yellow, yellow-rumped, orange-crowned warbler, hermit, black-throated gray warblers, yellow-breasted chat in the summer. western kingbird, western wood pewee, olive-sided flycatcher, Gray flycatcher, ash-throat-ed flycatcher, may also be seen in the summer.

Year-round residents are: greater roadrunner, Gambel's quail, ladder-backed woodpecker, Gila woodpecker, crissal thrasher, great-tailed grackle, verdin, black-tailed gnat-catcher, common yellow-throat sparrow, song sparrow.

Winter visitors include: osprey, blue-Gray gnat-catcher, and Lincoln's sparrow.

Rare and unusual birds that have been seen in the area include: northern parula (fall 2012), red-naped and red-breasted hybrid sapsucker (fall 2012), eastern phoebe (fall 2012), summer tanagers (November 2012).

Reptiles 
On the east side of the Yuma West Wetlands, large western diamond-backed rattlesnake have been spotted.

Insects

Butterflies

The butterfly habitat is west of the hummingbird garden. This habitat is filled with mostly yellow and orange flowering bushes and trees scattered throughout. The following butterflies are common:

giant swallowtail (Papilio cresphontes), monarch butterfly (Danaus plexippus), queen butterfly (Danaus gilippus), western pygmy blue butterfly (Brephidium exilis) or (Brephidium exile), orange sulphur butterfly(Colias), painted lady butterfly (Vanessa cardui), fiery skipper butterfly (Hylephila phyleus), funereal duskywing butterfly (Erynnis funeralis), and snout butterfly (Libytheinae).

Habitats 

The natural and man-made habitats that can be found at West Wetlands park are the Hummingbird Garden, Burrowing Owls, Butterfly Garden, Willow Fly Catcher Nesting Habitat, Millennium Grove, Beaver Pond, Lower Bench, and Cactus garden.

Habitat restoration 

Out of the 110 acres of the West Wetlands Park, approximately 30 percent is restored riparian habitat, known as the "Lower Bench". Prior to restoring the lower bench the area was deteriorated and overrun with trash and opportunist vegetation, in particular salt cedar and giant reeds.

Large expanses of non-native species were bulldozed from the area, as others were manually hoed out. Brush hogs, masticators, and or chemical herbicides are used to keep the invasive species under control. Consistent maintenance is needed  to eradicate the constantly growing giant reed.

Geology and hydrology 

The Yuma Area Office of the Geology and Groundwater Team of the Bureau of Reclamation, Yuma Area Office, in partnership with the US Geological Survey, completed geological investigations of the West Wetlands Park in 1970 and 1971. This investigation resulted from the  Arizona v. California water dispute.
Geologic boring, "Piezometer Yuma Area Logs" show that the area of the West Wetlands Park was approximately 12 to 17 feet of "garbage." Below the garbage there is about 80 feet of river deposited silt, sand and clay, which is consistent with the sediments found commonly in areas that are near deltaic and riparian environments. At about 100 feet depth, the top of the coarse-gravel zone is encountered, which is the most important water producing aquifer in the Yuma area.

References

External links 
 City of Yuma Parks and Recreation Department
 Photographs of the West Wetlands Park by Joan Ann Lansberry

Lower Colorado River Valley
Parks in Yuma County, Arizona
Yuma, Arizona
Cactus gardens